Barawal is a small village in the Bali Tehsil in the Pali district of the Indian state of Rajasthan.

Villages in Pali district